The clamorous reed warbler (Acrocephalus stentoreus) is an Old World warbler in the genus Acrocephalus. It breeds from Egypt eastwards through Pakistan, Afghanistan and northernmost India to south China and southeast Asia. A. s. meridionalis is an endemic race in Sri Lanka.

Subspecies
Nine subspecies are recorded:
A. s. stentoreus (Hemprich & Ehrenberg, 1833) 
A. s. brunnescens (Jerdon, 1839)
A. s. amyae Stuart Baker, 1922
A. s. meridionalis (Legge, 1875) 
A. s. siebersi Salomonsen, 1928
A. s. lentecaptus E. J. O. Hartert, 1924
A. s. harterti Salomonsen, 1928
A. s. celebensis Heinroth, 1903 
A. s. sumbae E. J. O. Hartert, 1924

Description
Clamorous reed warbler is a large song thrush-sized warbler at 18–20 cm. The adult has an unstreaked brown back and whitish underparts. The forehead is flattened, and the bill is strong and pointed. The sexes are identical, as with most warblers. It is very like the great reed warbler, but that species has richer coloured underparts.

There are a number of races differing in plumage shades. The migratory northern race has the richest brown upperparts, and the endemic Sri Lanka subspecies is the darkest form.

Like most warblers, the clamorous reed warbler is insectivorous, but will take other small prey items.

The song is loud and far-carrying, but less raucous than that of the great reed warbler. It is a slow, chattering  with typically acrocephaline whistles and mimicry added.

Habitat
Most populations are sedentary, but the breeding birds in Pakistan, Afghanistan and north India are migratory, wintering in peninsular India and Sri Lanka.

This passerine bird is a species found in large reed beds, often with some bushes. 3-6 eggs are laid in a basket nest in reeds.

References 

 Warblers of Europe, Asia and North Africa by Baker, ISBN
 Birds of India by Grimmett, Inskipp and Inskipp, ISBN

clamorous reed warbler
Birds of Central Asia
Birds of Afghanistan
Birds of Pakistan
Birds of the Middle East
Birds of Yunnan
clamorous reed warbler
Taxa named by Christian Gottfried Ehrenberg